Tereza Švábíková (born 14 May 2000) is a Czech badminton player from B.O. Chance Ostrava.

Career 
She started playing badminton at her hometown Klimkovice in 2008. The biggest senior international achievements:  9.place at EC2017 in WD, Qualified to WC 2017 in WD,2. place at Yonex Latvia International 2017 in WS, 2. place at Czech International 2017 in XD, 2. place at Romanian International 2017 in XD, 3.place at Polish Open 2017 in WD,2. place at Yonex Lithuania International 2017 in XD,2. place at Yonex Latvia International 2017 in XD. The biggest junior international achievements: WS:  5.place at EJC 2017,1.place at Slovenia junior 2016, Cyprus junior 2014 2.place at Cyprus junior 2015, Slovakia junior 2015,  3.place at Swedish junior 2017, Hungarian junior 2017, Hungarian junior 2016, WD: 1.place at Hungarian junior 2017, Cyprus junior 2015, 2.place at Slovakia junior 2016, Hungarian junior 2016, Slovakia junior 2015, XD:  1.place at Cyprus junior 2014 2.place at Cyprus junior 2015 3.place at Czech junior 2016, Slovenia Junior. 2016. National senior achievements: WS: 1.place at Czech national championship in 2017,2018,2019 and 2020, 3.place at Czech national championship 2016, WD: 3.place at Czech national championship 2017, Junior national achievements: 23 Czech champion titles, The best Czech junior player  of  2016 and 2017  In May 2017, she became the mixed doubles runner-up in three BWF Future Series tournaments partnered with Filip Budzel. At the Czech International they were beaten by their compatriots Jakub Bitman and Alzbeta Basova. In Romania, they were defeated by the German pair, and in Latvia defeated by the French pair.

Achievements

BWF International Challenge/Series (7 runner-up) 
Women's singles

Women's doubles

Mixed doubles

  BWF International Challenge tournament
  BWF International Series tournament
  BWF Future Series tournament

References

External links 

 
 

2000 births
Living people
People from Klimkovice
Czech female badminton players
Badminton players at the 2018 Summer Youth Olympics
Sportspeople from the Moravian-Silesian Region